Aco Karamanov (January 31, 1927 - October 7, 1944) was a Macedonian poet and partisan. In Bulgaria he is considered Bulgarian.

Karamanov was born in Radoviš, then in the Kingdom of Serbs, Croats and Slovenes. Since the beginning of his education he exhibited affinity to writing, He started writing songs at the early age of 9 years. Between September 5, and October 7, 1944 Karamanov fought against the withdrawing Germans.

This talented writer lived for only 17 years, but his human messages written in poems are left to testify for the war. He is considered one of the founders of contemporary Macedonian literature. His poetry was originally written in Serbo-Croatian and Bulgarian, and was translated into Macedonian after its codification in 1945. According to the Bulgarian literary critic and politician Alexander Yordanov, part of the works of the poet, has not been translated into Macedonian, due to its bulgarophile content.

The town of Radoviš holds each year in his honor a poetry festival "Aco Karamanov Poetry Meetings"

References

External links 
 	The great poem by Aco Karamanov 

1927 births
1944 deaths
People from Radoviš
Macedonian poets
Bulgarian poets
Yugoslav communists
Yugoslav Partisans members
20th-century poets